Forestville is a census-designated place (CDP) in Sonoma County, California, United States. It was settled during the late 1860s and was originally spelled Forrestville after one of its founders. The spelling long ago became standardized with one "r". The population was 3,293 at the 2010 census, an increase of nearly 1,000 since the 2000 census.

By 1900, the community was known for attracting writers and artists and had a bohemian reputation. The small town has a limited number of businesses.

History and features

Forestville's unofficial motto is "Forestville, The Good Life." This phrase appears on license plate holders sold at the local hardware store. The major road through town is Front Street for the length of the town, a distance of about three blocks, between Covey Road and Mirabel Road. It has been made part of Highway 116. The "downtown" blocks were first developed during the 1870s and 1880s. A fire destroyed many of the older structures, and existing buildings date mostly to the early 20th century. According to Sonoma State University professor Jonah Raskin, Forestville "was a gathering place for bohemians and writers and artists, circa 1900."

Today businesses in the town consist of one gas station, one bar, one hardware store, two grocery stores, two convenience markets, a pharmacy, several churches, a number of restaurants, a post office, an assortment of small businesses, a fire station operated by a volunteer fire department, a volunteer-run Youth Park, and three ATMs. The annual Forestville Youth Park Parade is held each June as a fund-raising event. It is associated with two days of music, bingo, and carnival rides in the Youth Park. Food and handicrafts booths are staffed by local vendors and non-profit organizations.

A number of bed and breakfast inns and wineries have been developed along the Russian River and to the east.

Geography and environment
Near Forestville is the confluence of the Laguna de Santa Rosa and Mark West Creek with the Russian River. South of Forestville are found the endangered Pitkin Marsh lily and White sedge. To the north are the Russian River, Steelhead Beach Park, and Mount Jackson; to the west are the Redwood forests; and to the East and South are many rolling hills on which are planted wine grape vineyards and apple orchards.

Demographics

2010
At the 2010 census Forestville had a population of 3,293. The racial makeup of Forestville was 2,914 (88.5%) White, 32 (1.0%) African American, 36 (1.1%) Native American, 53 (1.6%) Asian, 6 (0.2%) Pacific Islander, 153 (4.6%) from other races, and 99 (3.0%) from two or more races. Hispanic or Latino of any race were 406 people (12.3%).

The census reported that 99.0% of the population lived in households and 1.0% lived in non-institutionalized group quarters.

There were 1,429 households, 335 (23.4%) had children under the age of 18 living in them, 617 (43.2%) were opposite-sex married couples living together, 124 (8.7%) had a female householder with no husband present, 63 (4.4%) had a male householder with no wife present.  There were 127 (8.9%) unmarried opposite-sex partnerships, and 37 (2.6%) same-sex married couples or partnerships. 446 households (31.2%) were one person and 110 (7.7%) had someone living alone who was 65 or older. The average household size was 2.28.  There were 804 families (56.3% of households); the average family size was 2.92.

The age distribution was 581 people (17.6%) under the age of 18, 242 people (7.3%) aged 18 to 24, 682 people (20.7%) aged 25 to 44, 1,325 people (40.2%) aged 45 to 64, and 463 people (14.1%) who were 65 or older.  The median age was 47.5 years. For every 100 females, there were 101.3 males.  For every 100 females age 18 and over, there were 100.9 males.

The homeowner vacancy rate was 1.2%; the rental vacancy rate was 6.5%. 70.4% of the population lived in owner-occupied housing units and 28.5% lived in rental housing units.

2000
At the 2000 census there were 2,370 people, 941 households, and 592 families in the CDP. The racial makeup of the CDP was 89.28% White, 1.14% African American, 1.18% Native American, 1.60% Asian, 0.17% Pacific Islander, 2.78% from other races, and 3.84% from two or more races. Hispanic or Latino of any race were 10.00%.

Of the 941 households 31.9% had children under the age of 18 living with them, 48.4% were married couples living together, 11.7% had a female householder with no husband present, and 37.0% were non-families. 26.4% of households were one person and 6.9% were one person aged 65 or older.  The average household size was 2.48 and the average family size was 3.05.

The age distribution was 24.7% under the age of 18, 5.5% from 18 to 24, 23.9% from 25 to 44, 34.8% from 45 to 64, and 11.1% 65 or older.  The median age was 43 years. For every 100 females, there were 92.2 males.  For every 100 females age 18 and over, there were 88.9 males.

The median household income was $50,898 and the median family income was $60,417. Males had a median income of $45,170 versus $42,652 for females. The per capita income for the CDP was $31,301.  About 5.1% of families and 7.9% of the population were below the poverty line, including 6.7% of those under age 18 and 2.9% over 64.

School system
Forestville has two schools: Forestville Elementary School and El Molino High School. The high school provides 9–12 grade education to the majority of students in the Russian River area. During the 2017–18 school year, enrollment was 595 students.

Government
Forestville is represented by the following elected officials:
 Sonoma County Board of Supervisors: Lynda Hopkins (Nonpartisan)
 California State Assembly: 
 California State Senate: 
 United States House of Representatives: 
 United States Senate: Alex Padilla and Dianne Feinstein

Notable people
James Walker Benét, reporter for the San Francisco Chronicle and KQED, veteran of the Abraham Lincoln Brigade during the Spanish Civil War
 Rosemary Gladstar, founder of an herbal school named after her
 Ben McKee, bassist of the band Imagine Dragons
 Catherine Yronwode, editor of comic books and non-fiction trading cards, author and graphics designer

References

Census-designated places in Sonoma County, California
Census-designated places in California